Gay media refers to media that predominantly targets a gay, lesbian or LGBTQ+ allied audience. The primary target market for gay media may also more broadly be considered to include members of an LGBTQ+ community. Secondary targets are LGBTQ+ allies, and in some instances those who oppose gay rights may be targeted as a form of activism to change their minds. There are many types of gay media, and the type is determined by the purpose of the media presented. Gay or queer media can also be defined as web sites, films, magazines and other cultural products that were created by queer individuals, or groups that are typically out, meaning that they are public or open about their identity. Gay creators do not always include gay themes or issues in their productions but there is usually at least subtle references to queerness or acceptance in this media.

Representation in gay media is something that is important to consider. Again, the type or purpose of the media being produced has an impact on what challenges it faces and what should be monitored. One example is stereotypes, popular media has used this to characterize, classify, and attack LGBTQ+ people for decades. There have been both positive and negative representations of gay people in various types of media such as film, television, literature, press, etc.

Representation in the media is powerful, and particularly for youth. Therefore, invisibility in media keeps the powerless groups at the bottom of our social hierarchy. There have been studies that have shown that media can have an influence on LGBTQ+ people's self-realization, coming out, and current identities.

Film 

Hollywood has a complicated history with gay representation, evidenced by the Motion Picture Production Code which was an industry guideline to self-censor all major motion pictures from 1934 to 1968. Gay invisibility in media was a by-product of this Production Code that was held in place for more than 30 years. However, even in the 1960s and 1970s when gay representation was becoming more visible, it was also becoming more homophobic. Gay characters in this time period were represented very negatively whether that meant they were dangerous and suicidal or predatory and violent in such movies as The Children's Hour, The Boys in the Band, Midnight Express, and Vanishing Point . In the 1990s, films such as The Birdcage, Philadelphia, To Wong Foo Thanks for Everything, Flawless and In & Out were quite popular and proved that audiences were eager for gay representation. In 2005, Brokeback Mountain grossed over $178 million and in 2017, Moonlight won the Academy Award for Best Picture along with Actor in a Supporting Role and Adapted Screenplay. Gay representation is now quite commonplace in film so it is now more important to analyze how accurate and beneficial these representations actually are. The gay man and heterosexual woman couple has become a genre itself in popular culture which does bring more mainstream visibility for gay men. This coupling exists in popular films such as My Best Friend's Wedding, The Object of my Affection, and The Next Best Thing. Some scholars argue that homosexuality is recoded and modified in these films to approve sexism as well as heteronormativity.

Television 

According to The Los Angeles Times, gays are so present on television because they are so present in television, meaning that gay people have always been somewhat integrated into the hierarchal structure of Hollywood However, this does not mean that all gay people in Hollywood were out, as the Code of Practices for Television Broadcasters indirectly prohibited positive homosexual representation from 1952 to 1983. In 1997, Ellen became the first show to have a gay main character. After this, there was an increase in shows that included recurring gay characters such as Will & Grace, Dawson's Creek, Spin City, ER, Buffy the Vampire Slayer, Nightline, Queer Eye for the Straight Guy, Queer as Folk, The Young and Restless, Ugly Betty and Glee. Reality TV shows have also frequently represented openly gay people, such as MTV's The Real World, CBS's Survivor and The Amazing Race.

See also
Gay news
Gay community
Gay marketing
LGBT
Homosexuality
List of transgender characters in film
Lists of American television episodes with LGBT themes
List of television series with bisexual characters
List of feature films with LGBT characters
List of comedy television series with LGBT characters
List of dramatic television series with LGBT characters: 1960s–2000s
List of dramatic television series with LGBT characters: 2010s
List of dramatic television series with LGBT characters: 2020s
List of made-for-television films with LGBT characters
List of LGBT characters in radio and podcasts
List of soap operas with LGBT characters
List of transgender characters in television
List of animated films with LGBT characters
List of lesbian, gay, bisexual or transgender-related films
List of made-for-television films with LGBT characters
List of LGBT-related films
List of LGBT characters in television and radio
Media portrayals of transgender people
Queerbaiting
Queer coding

References

LGBT studies articles needing attention